The North Plant City Residential District is a U.S. historic district (designated as such on May 27, 1993) located in Plant City, Florida. The district is bounded by Herring, Wheeler, Tever and Palmer Streets. It contains 73 historic buildings.

References

External links
 Hillsborough County listings at National Register of Historic Places

National Register of Historic Places in Hillsborough County, Florida
Historic districts on the National Register of Historic Places in Florida
Plant City, Florida